The 1959 NFL Championship Game was the 27th NFL championship game, played on December 27 at Memorial Stadium in Baltimore, Maryland.

It was a rematch of the 1958 championship game that went into overtime. The defending champion Baltimore Colts (9–3) again won the Western Conference, while the New York Giants (10–2) repeated as Eastern Conference champions.
The Colts were favored to repeat as champions by 3½ points.

This game also went down to the last quarter, but the Colts did not need any heroics in overtime. Trailing 9–7 at the start of the fourth quarter, Baltimore scored 24 straight points and won, 31–16.

This was the only NFL championship game played in Baltimore.

Scoring summary
Sunday, December 27, 1959
Kickoff: 2:05 p.m. EST

First quarter
BAL – Lenny Moore 60 yard pass from Johnny Unitas (Steve Myhra kick), BAL 7–0
NYG   – FG Pat Summerall 23, BAL 7–3
Second quarter
NYG   – FG Summerall 37, BAL 7–6
Third quarter
NYG   – FG Summerall 22, NYG 9–7
Fourth quarter
BAL – Unitas 4 yard run (Myhra kick), BAL 14–9
BAL – Jerry Richardson 12 yard pass from Unitas (Myhra kick), BAL 21–9
BAL – Johnny Sample 42 yard interception return (Myhra kick), BAL 28–9
BAL – FG Myhra 25, BAL 31–9
NYG   – Bob Schnelker 32 yard pass from Charlie Conerly (Summerall kick), BAL 31–16

Officials

Referee: Ron Gibbs
Umpire: Lou Palazzi
Head Linesman: Charlie Berry
Back Judge: Cleo Diehl
Field Judge: Chuck Sweeney

Alternate: William Downes
Alternate: Joe Connell
Alternate: John Highberger
Alternate: Stan Jaworowski
Alternate: Herm Rohrig

Players' shares
The gross receipts for the game, including radio and television rights, were just over $666,000, slightly below the previous year. Each player on the winning Colts team received $4,674, while Giants players made $3,083 each.

References

Championship Game
National Football League Championship games
Baltimore Colts postseason
New York Giants postseason
NFL Championship Game
NFL Championship Game
1950s in Baltimore
Sports competitions in Baltimore
American football in Baltimore